USS Vincennes (CG-49) was a  guided missile cruiser outfitted with the Aegis combat system that was in service with the United States Navy from July 1985 to June 2005. She was one of 27 ships of the Ticonderoga class constructed for the United States Navy and one of five equipped with the Mark 26 Guided Missile Launching System.

Vincennes was commissioned in 1985. She saw service in the Pacific before being dispatched to the Persian Gulf in 1988 in support of Operation Earnest Will during the Iran–Iraq War, which was led by Saddam Hussein and backed by the U.S. On July 3, 1988, during the Iran–Iraq War, Vincennes shot down Iran Air Flight 655, a civilian passenger plane with 290 people on board, all of whom were killed. The incident followed a catalog of errors.

Vincennes was decommissioned in 2005 after attempts to retrofit the cruiser with the Mark 41 Vertical Launching System (VLS) failed. She was initially laid up in a reserve fleet at the Naval Inactive Ship Maintenance Facility at Naval Base Kitsap in Bremerton, Washington. In 2010 the vessel was towed to Texas for scrapping, which was completed in 2011.

History

1980s
Vincennes was launched on 14 April 1984 and sponsored by Marilyn Quayle, wife of Indiana Senator Dan Quayle. Vincennes was named for the Battle of Vincennes during the American Revolutionary War; the previous Vincennes heavy cruiser and Vincennes light cruiser were named for the city of Vincennes, Indiana. The cruiser was commissioned at Pascagoula on 6 July 1985, with Captain George N. Gee in command. The ship normally carried guided missiles, rapid-fire cannons, and two Seahawk LAMPS helicopters for anti-submarine and anti-ship warfare, personnel transfers, and other purposes.

Vincennes was the first of the Ticonderoga-class cruisers to enter the Pacific Fleet. Upon commissioning in 1985, Vincennes helped test the SM-2 Block II surface-to-air missile. In May 1986, Vincennes participated in the multinational exercise RIMPAC 86, coordinating the anti-aircraft warfare efforts of two aircraft carriers and more than 40 ships from five nations. Vincennes was deployed in August 1986 to the Western Pacific and Indian Oceans.

Iran–Iraq War
During the Iran–Iraq War, the United States took active measures in the Persian Gulf to protect shipping, mainly oil tankers, that were being threatened by both countries.

Operation Earnest Will
On 14 April 1988, the guided missile frigate  hit a mine in the Persian Gulf during Operation Earnest Will. Six days later, Vincennes was redeployed from Fleet Exercise 88–2, sent back to San Diego, California, and told to prepare for a six-month deployment. The reason for the haste: Navy leaders decided that an Aegis ship was needed to protect the exit of the damaged Samuel B. Roberts through the Strait of Hormuz. One month later, the cruiser entered the Persian Gulf, and in early July, stood guard in the Strait as the damaged frigate was borne out on the heavy-lift ship Mighty Servant 2. The ship made 14 Hormuz transits during its Earnest Will operations.

Iran Air Flight 655

On 3 July 1988, Vincennes, under the command of Captain Will Rogers III, was on patrol when it was reported that Iranian Revolutionary Guard gunboats had attacked a Pakistani merchant vessel. Vincennes deployed one of her helicopters to investigate. Shortly thereafter, Rogers ordered his ship to move off station  to the north. The destroyer flotilla commander ordered Vincennes to return to her original station. Vincenness helicopter had followed the Revolutionary Guard gunboats into Iranian waters, and while maintaining contact with the boats, came under gunfire from the Iranians.

The helicopter crew reported that they had come under fire. With that report, Rogers turned his ship around and, with the frigate , moved to intercept the gunboats. In doing so, Vincennes crossed into Iranian waters herself. As the U.S. ships approached, the Iranian gunboats maneuvered in what Rogers claimed was a threatening fashion. Rogers requested permission to fire. Command, not knowing that Vincennes had crossed into Iranian waters, granted permission. Vincennes and Elmer Montgomery commenced fire upon the gunboats at 9:43 a.m., scoring several hits on the gunboats, sinking two and damaging another.

While Vincennes was firing on the Iranian gunboats, confusion reigned aboard the ship—the tracking of aircraft in the area had become muddled between Vincennes and other U.S. ships. Crucially, Vincennes misidentified an Iran Air Airbus A300 civilian airliner, Iran Air Flight 655 (IR655), as an attacking F-14 Tomcat fighter aircraft. IR655 was climbing at the time, and her IFF transponder was on the Mode III civilian code rather than on the purely military Mode II, as recorded by Vincenness own shipboard Aegis Combat System.

After issuing multiple radio challenges and receiving no response from the aircraft, Vincennes's crew commenced the process to engage it. The naval officer responsible for authorizing a missile launch, the watch's Anti-Air Warfare Coordinator (AAWC), pushed wrong buttons no fewer than five times in response to a system message to select a weapon. In the meantime, the officer in charge of firing missiles, the watch's Missile System Supervisor (MSS), pushed "REQUEST RADIATION ASSIGN" no fewer than 22 times, all without effect due to the AAWC not completing the appropriate process at his console. The AAWC finally selected the correct input at his console, allowing the MSS to again push "REQUEST RADIATION ASSIGN" and continue the process.

At 10:24 a.m, Vincennes fired two SM-2MR surface-to-air missiles, shooting down the Iranian civilian airliner over Iranian airspace in the Strait of Hormuz. All 290 passengers and crew on board were killed. The victims included 66 children and a family of 16 who were on their way to a wedding in Dubai.

The U.S. media backed up the official line, with The New York Times apportioning blame to the pilot, Mohsen Rezaian, and Iran. The U.S. military then claimed that the Vincennes was rushing to defend a merchant vessel under attack from Iran when an aircraft outside the commercial air corridor was descending in "attack mode" towards the ship, which was false on all three counts. They also tried to claim the ship was in international waters, and naval officials even deleted an Iranian island from the map they showed to Congress. In reality, it was in Iranian waters, in clear violation of international law.

The Iranian government has maintained that Vincennes knowingly shot down the civilian aircraft. IR655 flew every day out of Bandar Abbas—a civil and military airport—on a scheduled passenger flight to Dubai using established air lanes. The Italian navy and another U.S. warship, the frigate , confirmed that the plane was climbing—not diving to attack—at the time of the missile strike. The U.S. radio warnings were only broadcast on "guard" (121.5 MHz) and not air traffic control frequencies. The Vincennes crew also misidentified the altitude and position of the plane; the Airbus crew, if monitoring guard, could have interpreted the warnings as intended for another aircraft. Captain David Carlson of Sides later said that the airliner's destruction "marked the horrifying climax to Rogers' aggressiveness".

1990s
In February 1990, Vincennes was deployed on a third six-month tour of the western Pacific and Indian oceans with SH-60 helicopters from HSL-45 Detachment 13. The ship coordinated all battle group air events and served as the command-and-control flagship during Harpoon-Ex-90.

In August 1991, Vincennes departed for a fourth western Pacific deployment. Steaming with the aircraft carrier , Vincennes performed duties as the anti-air warfare commander for Battle Group Delta until detaching to participate as the United States representative in MERCUBEX 91, a joint United States and Republic of Singapore Navy exercise. Over the next three months, Vincennes participated in the bilateral exercise Valiant Blitz with the South Korean Navy, the bilateral exercise Annualex 03G with the Japanese Maritime Self Defense Force, and ASWEX 92-1K with the South Korean Navy before reaching Hong Kong to act as the U.S. representative for the Navy Days ceremonies. Vincennes returned from deployment on 21 December 1991.

In June 1994, Vincennes departed on a fifth western Pacific deployment with the  Battle Group. Vincennes performed duties as anti-air warfare commander for the battle group. During deployment, Vincennes conducted the anti-submarine exercise PASSEX 94–2 with the Japan Maritime Self-Defense Force; the bilateral exercise MERCUB 94–2, a joint U.S. and Singaporean Navy exercise of the Malaysian peninsula; the bilateral exercise Keen Edge with the Japan Maritime Self-Defense Force; and Tandem Thrust, a larger-scale joint exercise which Vincennes participated as the area air defense coordinator for the entire joint operating area. Vincennes returned from this deployment on 22 December 1994.

In August 1997, Vincennes changed homeport from San Diego to Yokosuka, Japan with SH-60B helicopters from HSL-49 Detachment 8G embarked. She then steamed to the South Pacific and took part in Exercise Valiant Usher 98–1 with the  amphibious ready group and the Royal Australian Navy destroyer . The combined exercise took place near Townsend Island, Australia.

Vincennes also took part in the U.S. Seventh Fleet's Fleet Battle Experiment Delta (FBE-D) from 24 October 1998 to 2 November 1998, in conjunction with the exercise Foal Eagle, a regularly scheduled exercise that simulates the military defense of South Korea. Sponsored by the Navy Warfare Development Command, FBE-D was the fourth in a series of experiments that tested new combat systems and procedures at sea.

2000s

On 12 August 2000, Vincennes completed Sharem 134, a bilateral exercise with several Japanese ships and other U.S. participants. The exercise included a week of undersea warfare training and data collection in the South China Sea. The ship tested her submarine detection, sonar range testing, and use of sonobuoys, and she developed new submarine prosecution procedures. The final Sharem events included a "free play", which allowed the cruiser to detect and prosecute other submarines, combining many of the tactics and systems tested during Sharem.

In mid-November 2000, the cruiser fired missile batteries at remote-controlled aerial drones provided by Fleet Activities Okinawa during MISSILEX 01–1.

Vincennes took part in a 23 August 2001 to 27 August 2001 military training exercise called Multi-Sail, which was designed to provide U.S. and Japanese forces interoperability training in multiple warfare areas.

Vincennes departed from Yokosuka on 17 September 2001 to conduct operations in support of Operation Enduring Freedom. The ship returned on 18 December 2001 after more than three months at sea.

In March 2003, Vincennes was assigned to Destroyer Squadron 15.

Decommissioning
While there had been several proposals through the 1990s to retrofit the Mark 41 VLS into Vincennes and her four sister ships to extend their service life, none were funded, and all five ships were instead decommissioned; Vincennes herself was decommissioned and later stricken on 29 June 2005 at San Diego, California. She was mothballed at the Naval Inactive Ship Maintenance Facility in Naval Base Kitsap, in Bremerton, Washington.

On 9 July 2010, a contract to scrap Vincennes was issued to International Shipbreaking, Brownsville, Texas. On 21 November 2010, Vincennes arrived via the Panama Canal to International Shipbreaking in Brownsville, Texas, and she was completely scrapped by 23 November 2011. After her scrapping, the United States presented pieces of the forward missile launcher used in the shoot down to the Interests Section of the Islamic Republic of Iran in the United States.

Awards and decorations
Vincennes has been awarded the Combat Action Ribbon (3 July 1988),
Navy Meritorious Unit Commendation (16 January 2 February 1987)
Battle Efficiency "E" three times (1990, 1993, 2001)
National Defense Service Medal
Vincennes also received a Meritorious Unit Commendation, along with the entire Kitty Hawk battle group, for 9 July 1994 9 December 1994. 
Vincennes also received two Armed Forces Expeditionary Medals for Persian Gulf service, 22 May 1988 21 August 1988 and 5 May 1990 1 June 1990.

Image gallery

References

Sources

Further reading

External links

 
 WebArchive.org – Archive of Official ship's history page from 2005
 Nayvsite.de – USS Vincennes page
 
 dod.mil – Investigation Report for the downing of Iran Air 655

 

Ticonderoga-class cruisers
Ships built in Pascagoula, Mississippi
1984 ships
Cold War cruisers of the United States